Ram Vanji Sutar (born 19 February 1925) is an Indian sculptor. He designed the Statue of Unity which is the world's tallest statue with a height of 182 metres (597 feet), exceeding the Spring Temple Buddha by 54 metres.

Personal life
Sutar was born in a Vishwakarma family, on 19 February 1925, in the village of Gondur, in Dhule district of Maharashtra. In 1952, he married Pramila.

Career

Sutar designed the Statue of Unity, the tallest statue of the world located in Gujarat. He also erected the 45-foot tall Chambal monument, as well as a bust of Mahatma Gandhi which was copied and sent to other countries. He designed the statue of Mahatma Gandhi in a seated position, located at the Parliament of India. A larger replica of the same was made by him at the Vidhana Soudha. He is also the designer of the 108-ft tall Kempe Gowda statue at the Bengaluru International Airport.

Awards
In 1999, he received the Padma Shri and later in 2016, Padma Bhushan from the Government of India. In October 2018, Sutar received the Tagore Award for cultural harmony of 2016.

Works

References

External links

 

1925 births
Living people
Indian male sculptors
20th-century Indian sculptors
Recipients of the Padma Shri in arts
People from Dhule district
People from Dhule
People from Maharashtra
Recipients of the Padma Bhushan in arts
20th-century Indian male artists